NGC 7065 Is a barred spiral galaxy located about 320 million light-years away in the constellation of Aquarius. NGC 7065 is part of a pair of galaxies that contains the galaxy NGC 7065A. NGC 7065 was discovered by astronomer Albert Marth on August 3, 1864.

See also 
 NGC 7042
 List of NGC objects (7001–7840)

References

External links 
 

Barred spiral galaxies
Aquarius (constellation)
7065
66766
Astronomical objects discovered in 1864